Montcalm Secondary School is a comprehensive "Technology Emphasis" secondary school located in northeast London, Ontario, Canada. The school provides a range of programs for all students. Student population is roughly 800.

Education
Montcalm offers a variety of courses for students at various levels. Academic courses are available in grade nine and ten. Applied courses are only available in grade ten. Locally developed courses are offered in grade 11 and 12. Montcalm also offers open courses. Thames Valley's aviation school runs out of Montcalm although it is available to all Thames Valley students.

Facilities
Cafeteria, auditorium and no portables. There is a dance studio. Every student has their own locker.

Annual events
 Music Nights
 S.C.R.O.O.G.E Canned Food Drive – Annual food drive where students go around to their community to collect cans for the London Food Bank. Montcalm has proven year after year to be a school whose students/community like to give back as they have reached the highest number of cans per student for several years in a row. After winning the gold medal for a number of consecutive years, a new award was made for them, the platinum award. (SCROOGE – Students' Christmas Rush for Oodles and Oodles of Goodies, Etc.)
 United Way Stairclimb
 Career fair
 Cancer Campaign – A week-long charity event to help raise money to send kids to Camp Trillium, a cancer camp for kids. Montcalm is the only high school within the district that raises money for Camp Trillium.
 Fusion Fashion Show – A multi-cultural display of fashion and musical talents put on by the Multi-Cultural Club.

Clubs/Teams
 Football
 Boys Soccer (2019 AA City Champions)
 Girls Soccer
 Wrestling
 Track and Field
 Varsity Hockey
 Basketball
 Volleyball
 Badminton (Junior Team - 2019 AA City Champions)
 Choir
 Band
 Jazz Band
 Audio/Visual Club
 Multicultural Club
 Social Justice Club
 Student Council
 Jack.Org
 Improv Club
 Board Game Club
 Multicultural Club

Athletic spaces
 Two gyms
 Weight room
 Tennis courts
 Football field
 Soccer field
 Baseball diamond
 Track

Notable alumni
 David McLellan, Canadian swimmer, 1992 Barcelona Olympics 1500m Freestyle
 Casey Patton, Canadian Boxer, 5 time Canadian champion, 1994 Commonwealth Games Gold Medalist, 1996 Atlanta Olympics, London Sports Hall of Fame inductee
 Pat Riggin, Former London Knight and NHL goalie
 Damian Warner, Canadian decathlete, 2020 Tokyo Olympic Gold Medalist

See also
List of high schools in Ontario

References

 School Choices, School Choices, London Free Press, January 30, 2009, Retrieved 2008-09-24

External links
 School's Official Website
Athletic Website

High schools in London, Ontario
Educational institutions in Canada with year of establishment missing